The Bureau of Medicine and Surgery (BUMED) is an agency of the United States Department of the Navy that manages health care activities for the United States Navy and the United States Marine Corps.  BUMED operates hospitals and other health care facilities as well as laboratories for biomedical research, and trains and manages the Navy's many staff corps related to medicine.  Its headquarters is located at the Defense Health Headquarters in Fairfax County, Virginia.  BUMED has 63,000 medical personnel and more than a million eligible beneficiaries.

History 
BUMED was one of the original five Navy bureaus formed in 1842 to replace the Board of Navy Commissioners. It is one of two bureaus still in existence.  BUMED was headquartered at the Old Naval Observatory from 1942 until 2012.

In 2005, Navy Medicine aligned its shore facilities into four overarching commands: Navy Medicine East, Navy Medicine West, Navy Medicine National Capital Area, and Navy Medicine Support Command.  In 2012, Navy Medicine Support Command was renamed and realigned into the Navy Medicine Education and Training Command, with its non-training units becoming independent under BUMED.  Navy Medicine National Capital Area's largest component, the National Naval Medical Center in Bethesda, Maryland, was merged in 2011 with Walter Reed Army Medical Center to form the joint Walter Reed National Military Medical Center as a result of the 2005 Base Realignment and Closure Commission.  The merged facility came under the jurisdiction of the new Joint Task Force National Capital Region/Medical, and in 2013, Navy Medicine National Capital Area was disestablished, with its few remaining facilities transferred to Navy Medicine East.

While a 2006 report of the Defense Business Board recommended that the Army, Navy, and Air Force medical commands be merged into a single joint command, citing savings in budget and personnel, this recommendation was not carried out and in 2012 the Defense Health Agency (DHA) was established separately from the military medical commands.  All three military medical commands were however all moved to share the new Defense Health Headquarters facility in Falls Church with DHA, again as a result of the 2005 Base Realignment and Closure.

Organization

Departments 

The commanding officer of BUMED is the Surgeon General of the United States Navy, a rear admiral. BUMED is divided into ten departments, each referred to with an alphanumerical code. Each of the staff corps is headed by a rear admiral, except for the Hospital Corps, which is headed by a force master chief petty officer because of its status as an enlisted rating.  The other department heads are mostly either rear admirals or civilians.

 M00: Corps Chiefs 
 M00C1: Chief, Medical Corps
 M00C2: Chief, Dental Corps
 M00C3: Chief, Nurse Corps
 M00C4: Director, Medical Service Corps
 M00C5: Director, Hospital Corps
 M00C6: Director, Civilian Corps
 Deputy Chief, Total Force (DCTF)
 M1: Manpower and Resources 
 M7: Education and Training
 Deputy Chief, Business Operations (DCBO)
 Fleet Support & Logistics (M4)
 Information Management & Technology (M6)
 Deputy Chief, Resource Management/Comptroller (DCRM/C)
 Deputy Director, Financial Management (M8)
 Assistant Deputy Chief, Capabilities Requirements (M9)
 Deputy Chief, Operations, Plans & Readiness (OP&R)
 M2: Research and Development
 M3: Health Care Operations
 M5: Patient Safety, Clinical Quality & High Reliability/Office of the Chief Medical Officer (M5)

Subordinate commands 

BUMED operates the following facilities and commands:

Bureau of Medicine and Surgery, Falls Church, Virginia

Naval Medical Forces Atlantic:

Naval Medical Forces Atlantic, Portsmouth, Virginia
Naval Medical Center Portsmouth, 	Portsmouth, Virginia
Naval Hospital Beaufort, 	Beaufort, South Carolina
Naval Hospital Camp Lejeune, 	Camp Lejeune, North Carolina
Naval Hospital Guantanamo Bay, 	Guantanamo, Cuba
Naval Hospital Jacksonville, 	Jacksonville, Florida
Naval Hospital Naples, 	Naples, Italy
Naval Hospital Pensacola, 	Pensacola, Florida
Naval Hospital Rota, 	Rota, Cádiz, Spain
Naval Hospital Sigonella, 	Sigonella, Italy
Captain James A. Lovell Federal Health Care Center, 	Great Lakes, Illinois
Naval Health Clinic Annapolis, 	Annapolis, Maryland
Naval Health Clinic Charleston, 	North Charleston, South Carolina
Naval Health Clinic Cherry Point, 	Cherry Point, North Carolina
Naval Health Clinic Corpus Christi, 	Corpus Christi, Texas
Naval Health Clinic New England, 	Newport, Rhode Island
Naval Health Clinic Patuxent River, 	Patuxent River, Maryland
Naval Health Clinic Quantico, 	Quantico, Virginia
2nd Dental Battalion, 	Camp Lejeune, North Carolina

Naval Medical Forces Pacific:

Naval Medical Forces Pacific, San Diego, California
Naval Medical Center San Diego, 	San Diego, California
Naval Hospital Bremerton, 	Bremerton, Washington
Naval Hospital Camp Pendleton, 	Camp Pendleton, California
Naval Hospital Lemoore, 	Lemoore, California
Naval Hospital Oak Harbor, 	Oak Harbor, Washington
Naval Hospital Twentynine Palms, 	Twentynine Palms, California
Naval Hospital Guam, 	Agana Heights, Guam
Naval Hospital Okinawa, 	Okinawa, Japan
Naval Hospital Yokosuka Japan, 	Yokosuka, Japan
Naval Health Clinic Hawaii, 	Pearl Harbor, Hawaii
1st Dental Battalion,  	Camp Pendleton, California
3rd Dental Battalion, 	Okinawa, Japan

Naval Medical Forces Support Command:

Naval Medical Forces Support Command, San Antonio, Texas
Walter Reed National Military Medical Center, Bethesda, Maryland
Navy Medicine Training Support Center, San Antonio, Texas
Navy Medicine Operational Training Center, Pensacola, Florida

Other commands:

Naval Medical Research Center, Silver Spring, Maryland
Naval Health Research Center, San Diego, California
Naval Submarine Medical Research Laboratory, Groton, Connecticut
Naval Medical Research Unit Dayton, Dayton, Ohio
Naval Medical Research Unit San Antonio, San Antonio, Texas
Naval Medical Research Unit 2, Phnom Penh, Cambodia
Naval Medical Research Unit 3, Cairo, Egypt
Naval Medical Research Center Asia, Singapore
Naval Medical Research Unit 6, Lima, Peru
Naval Medical Logistics Command, Fort Detrick, Maryland
Naval Ophthalmic Support and Training Activity, Yorktown, Virginia
Navy Medicine Information Systems Support Activity, San Antonio, Texas
Navy and Marine Corps Public Health Center, Portsmouth, Virginia
Navy Drug Screening Lab Jacksonville, Jacksonville, Florida

Hospital ships:

While the Medical Treatment Facility on each hospital ship is operated by BUMED's medical personnel, the ships themselves are operated by civilian mariners employed by Military Sealift Command.

USNS Mercy (T-AH-19), 	San Diego, California
USNS Comfort (T-AH-20),  	Norfolk, Virginia

See also

Army Medical Department (United States)
United States Air Force Medical Service
United States Public Health Service

References

9.  Navy Medicine Leadership. http://www.navy.mil/navydata/bios/navybio.asp?bioID=602

External links 
 
 
 

1842 establishments in the United States
Medicine and Surgery
Medicine in the United States Navy
Military medical organizations of the United States
Military units and formations established in 1842